Renzo Olivo was the defending champion but lost in the semifinals to Andrea Vavassori.

Raúl Brancaccio won the title after defeating Vavassori 6–1, 6–1 in the final.

Seeds

Draw

Finals

Top half

Bottom half

References

External links
Main draw
Qualifying draw

San Benedetto Tennis Cup - 1
2022 Singles